Działyń may refer to the following places in Poland:
Działyń, Kuyavian-Pomeranian Voivodeship (north-central Poland)
Działyń, Lublin Voivodeship (east Poland)
Działyń, Masovian Voivodeship (east-central Poland)
Działyń, Greater Poland Voivodeship (west-central Poland)